Henry Paget, 2nd Baron Paget (c. 1539 – 28 December 1568) was an English MP and peer.

Henry Paget was the eldest son of William Paget, 1st Baron Paget of Beaudesert, Staffordshire and his wife Anne Preston (d.1587), the daughter and heir of Henry Preston. He was knighted in 1553, and succeeded to the title at the death of his father in 1563.

Paget was elected as Member of Parliament for Arundel in 1555 and for Lichfield in 1559 and 1563.

Marriage and issue

In 1567 Paget married Katherine Knyvet, sister of the courtiers Sir Henry Knyvet (1537?–1598) and Thomas Knyvet (1545/6-1622), 1st Baron Knyvet of Escrick, and daughter of Sir Henry Knyvet (died c. 1546) by Anne Pickering, the daughter of Sir Christopher Pickering of Killington, Westmorland. Before her marriage to Sir Henry Knyvet (died c. 1546), Katherine's mother, Anne Pickering, had been married to Sir Francis Weston (executed in 1536), and after Sir Henry Knyvet's death she married John Vaughan (d. 1577). Katherine Knyvet's grandfather, the courtier Sir Thomas Knyvet (c.1485–1512) of Buckenham, Norfolk, was Master of the Horse to King Henry VIII, and the husband of Muriel Howard (d.1512), daughter of Thomas Howard, 2nd Duke of Norfolk and widow of John Grey, 2nd Viscount Lisle, by whom she was the mother of Elizabeth Grey, Viscountess Lisle, one time betrothed of Charles Brandon, Duke of Suffolk and wife of Henry Courtenay.

Henry Paget and Katherine Knyvet had a daughter, Elizabeth, who was four months old when Paget died on 28 December 1568. Since Paget died without male issue, it has generally been thought that the title passed immediately to his brother, Thomas, as 3rd Baron Paget. However, according to a decision of the House of Lords in 1770, Henry Paget was succeeded in the title in 1568 by his daughter, Elizabeth, and it was not until 1570 that his brother, Thomas, became Lord Paget.

Paget's widow, Katherine, married Sir Edward Carey of Aldenham, Hertfordshire, by whom she had several children, including Henry Carey, 1st Viscount Falkland.

Footnotes

References

 
 
 
 
 
 
History of Parliament PAGET, Sir Henry (1536/7-68), of Beaudesert, Staffs

1530s births
1568 deaths
Henry
English MPs 1555
English MPs 1559
English MPs 1563–1567
16th-century English nobility
Barons Paget